Bloomsbury and the Poets is a 2014 book by Nicholas Murray.

Synopsis
The book details the history of literature in the Bloomsbury district of London, including the Bloomsbury Group.

Reception
In The Spectator the book was praised as 'a delight' by Wynn Wheldon while in the New Welsh Review the book was reviewed by Amy McCauley who wrote 'The writing is energetic, witty, and authoritative, demonstrating an astonishing breadth of reading and research'.

References

2014 non-fiction books
Books about London
Oral history books
History books about London
Bloomsbury
Bloomsbury Group publications